Svein Magnus Håvarstein (28 December 1942 – 18 January 2013) was a Norwegian sculptor and  graphic artist.

Biography
He was born in Rennesøy  in Rogaland, Norway. He studied at the Norwegian National Academy of Fine Arts from 1962 to 1965  under Professor Per Palle Storm. He also attended the Norwegian National Academy of Craft and Art Industry in 1964 where he trained under Chrix Dahl.  He debuted at the Western Norway Exhibition (Vestlandsutstillingen) in 1963. He participated six times at the Autumn Exhibition (Høstutstillingen) in Oslo.

He was awarded the Benneches legat 1963 and 1969 as well as the  Lorch-Schivess Legacy in 1971. He conducted  study trips between  1974–1976  to Greece, the Netherlands, Sweden and Denmark. In 1983, Håvarstein received the Stavanger Aftenblad cultural prize (Stavanger Aftenblads kulturpris).
For the most part, Håvarstein worked with sculpture, but also made graphics and book illustrations.
Håvarstein is represented by works at the Norwegian Museum of Contemporary Art, the National Gallery of Norway, and the Arts Council Norway.

References

1942 births
2013 deaths
People from Rennesøy
Oslo National Academy of the Arts alumni
20th-century Norwegian sculptors
20th-century Norwegian artists